This entry refers to the Parasports Division of Panathinaikos For all the departments of the club see the main article Panathinaikos A.O.

Panathinaikos Athletic Club People with Disabilities is the parasports department of the Greek sports club Panathinaikos, established on 3 December 2018. Its aim is to enable people with disabilities to compete in sports.

Departments
Panathinaikos Athletic Club People with Disabilities has established so far 20 departments for an equivalent number of parasports, with most of them (16) currently included in the Paralympic Games programme, with the exception of amputee football, blind chess,  wheelchair dancesport, and basketball ID.

Wheelchair basketball

Roster

 (ab) able-bodied

Honours
 Greek League (A1)
 Winners (1) : 2021–22

 Greek Cup
 Winners (1) : 2021–22

 Super Cup
 Winners (1) : 2022

Season by season

Wheelchair Fencing

Honours 

 2 Greek Championships Men and Women: 2021,  2022

Amputee Football

Honours 

 1 Greek Developmental Cup: 2021
 1 (1st) Greek Championship: 2022

Para-cycling

Honours 

 1 Greek Championship of Para-Cycling Track: 2021

References

External links
  of the department 
 Official website of the club
Wheelchair basketball team's roster on the Wheelchair Basketball Federation page

Panathinaikos A.O.
2018 establishments in Greece
Parasports teams
Wheelchair basketball teams in Greece